Guarea velutina is a species of plant in the family Meliaceae. It is endemic to Brazil.  It is threatened by habitat loss.

References

velutina
Endemic flora of Brazil
Vulnerable plants
Taxonomy articles created by Polbot